The Women's Kemper Open was a golf tournament on the LPGA Tour from 1979 to 1992. It was played at several different courses in California and Hawaii.

Tournament locations

Winners
1992 Dawn Coe
1991 Deb Richard
1990 Beth Daniel
1989 Betsy King
1988 Betsy King
1987 Jane Geddes
1986 Juli Inkster
1985 Jane Blalock
1984 Betsy King
1983 Kathy Whitworth
1982 Amy Alcott
1981 Pat Bradley
1980 Nancy Lopez
1979 JoAnne Carner

Tournament highlights
1979: For the first time ever, an LPGA Tour event ends regulation play with five golfers tied for the lead. JoAnne Carner goes on to par the second sudden-death playoff hole to defeat Hisako Higuchi, Nancy Lopez, Donna Caponi, and Jan Stephenson.
1984: Future World Golf Hall of Fame member Betsy King wins for the first time on the LPGA Tour. She finishes two shots ahead of Pat Bradley.
1985: Jane Blalock notches her first LPGA Tour win in nearly five years when Pat Bradley makes double bogey on the tournament's 72nd hole to lose by one shot.
1990: Beth Daniel birdies the final two holes to complete a seven-shot comeback and win by one shot over Laura Davies and Rosie Jones.

References

External links
Tournament results (1979-1992) at GolfObserver.com
Mesa Verde Country Club
Royal Kaanapali
Princeville Makai Golf Course
Wailea Golf Club, Blue Course

Former LPGA Tour events
Golf in California
Golf in Hawaii
1979 establishments in California
1992 disestablishments in Hawaii
Recurring sporting events established in 1979
Recurring events disestablished in 1992
Women's sports in California
History of women in Hawaii